The Student Government Program (SGP) is the Philippines' program for pupil governments in elementary schools and student governments in secondary schools of the Department of Education, under the Office of the Undersecretary for Administration. It is the foremost co-curricular student organization authorized to implement pertinent programs, projects, and activities in Philippine schools as mandated by the Department of Education.

The Philippines has a complex student union with different names such as student government, the term used in all public secondary schools and some of the universities and/or colleges and student council for most of the colleges/universities.

History
The Center for Students and Co-Curricular Affairs (CSCA) was established in 1996 in order to further facilitate co-curricular work of student councils in the country and mold them to be better leaders.
In 2003, the Supreme Student Governments were institutionalized starting with the establishment of the National Federation of Supreme Student Governments (NFSSG) with David Maulas of Bohol as its first National Federation President elected during the 1st National Leadership Training for Student Government Officers (NLTSGO). An institutionalized Constitution and By Laws of the Supreme Student Governments were enforced through a Department Order No. 43, s. 2005, then revised in 2009 as per Department Order No. 79, s. 2009. The last set of National Federation officers were elected on SY 2020–2021 with Ken Bien Mar Caballes of CARAGA Region as the last National Federation President.
In 2014, through Department Order No. 47, s. 2014 the Constitution and By-Laws of Supreme Pupil Governments in elementary schools and Supreme Student Governments in secondary schools around the country were unified. This marks the year where the Supreme Pupil Governments are institutionalized.
Currently the program is now under the Office of the Undersecretary for Administration (OUA), through the Bureau of Learner Support Services - Youth Formation Division (BLSS-YFD).

Notes
 SGP - Student Government Program; SPG - Supreme Pupil Government; SSG - Supreme Student Government
 All bona fide students enrolled are considered as members of the SPG/SSG as stated in Article IV, Section 1 of the Constitution and By-Laws of the Supreme Pupil Government and Supreme Student Government in Elementary and Secondary Schools.

References

 
 
 

Groups of students' unions
Higher education in the Philippines
Student government